Oor Wullie is a Scottish comic strip published in the D.C. Thomson newspaper The Sunday Post. It features a character called Wullie; Wullie is a Scots nickname for boys named William, equivalent to Willie. His trademarks are spiky hair, dungarees and an upturned bucket, which he uses as a seat: most strips since early 1937 begin and end with a single panel of Wullie sitting on his bucket. The earliest strips, with little dialogue, ended with Wullie complaining (e.g., "I nivver get ony fun roond here!"). The artistic style settled down by 1940 and has changed little since. A frequent tagline reads, "Oor Wullie! Your Wullie! A'body's Wullie!" (Our Willie! Your Willie! Everybody's Willie!).

Created by Thomson editor R. D. Low and drawn by cartoonist Dudley D. Watkins, the strip first appeared on 8 March 1936. Watkins continued to draw Oor Wullie until his death in 1969, after which the Post recycled his work into the 1970s. New strips were eventually commissioned from Tom Lavery, followed by Peter Davidson and Robert Nixon. Ken H. Harrison drew the strip from 1989 until 1997, when Davidson resumed duties. Between January 2005 and 2006, storylines were written by broadcaster Tom Morton from his home in Shetland, and subsequently they were written by Dave Donaldson, managing director of Thomson's comics division. The current writer is former Dandy editor Morris Heggie.

Between 2016 and 2017, artist Diego Jourdan Pereira filled in for Peter Davidson on Wullie, The Broons and Wee Harry. Jourdan Pereira also provided illustrations for the 2017 Annual and official merchandising.

Characters and story 

Although Wullie's hometown was unnamed in the original Watkins strips, it has been called Auchenshoogle since the late 1990s.

Wullie's gang consists of himself, Fat Bob, Wee Eck and Soapy Soutar. Wullie is the self-proclaimed leader, a position which is frequently disputed by the others. In early strips, the gang met in a wooden shed - usually located in the garden at Wullie's house. He also owns a pet mouse named Jeemy (Scots for 'Jimmy').

Wullie and his friends roam the streets of his town, though he is sometimes depicted at school which he finds confining. Praise from his teacher, who addresses him as "William", is rare and acutely embarrassing. His adventures often consist of unrealistic get-rich-quick schemes that lead to mischief, to the despair of his parents, Ma and Pa. Wullie's Pa is called "Tam"; the only reference to this is in a strip from the sixties during a conversation between Pa and the local policeman,  Wullie's arch-nemesis, P.C. Murdoch.

People such as Nicola Sturgeon, Ewan McGregor, Andy Murray and Amy Macdonald have appeared in the strip over the years. In December 2016, Nicola Sturgeon featured Oor Wullie on a Christmas card, with the original illustration being auctioned for charity.

When The Topper launched in 1953, Oor Wullie appeared in the masthead, although not as a story in the comic. He often appeared sitting on his bucket, though other poses were used as well. The pose on Topper No. 1 had him wearing a top hat. He had the top hat in one hand and the other hand pointing at the Topper logo.

Annuals
Starting in 1940 the Oor Wullie strips also appeared in the form of a Christmas annual which alternated every second year with “The Broons”, another D. C. Thomson product. (No annuals were published between 1943 and 1946.) Pre-1966 annuals were undated.  Starting in 2015, both titles are now published together annually.

A facsimile of the first The Broons annual was released on 25 November 2006 and of the first Oor Wullie annual the following year, celebrating the 70th anniversary of the strip.

Since 1996 - the 60th anniversary of the strip - D.C. Thomson has also published a series of compilation books featuring The Broons and Oor Wullie on alternate pages.

The early stories are often recycled in current annuals. An example being the "twin cousin" story in the 2018 annual being first seen in the fifties.

Bucket Trails

In celebration of Oor Wullie's 80th anniversary in 2016, he was the subject of a public art project when 55 decorated 5 ft sculptures of him were placed around Dundee and its environs with another 13 touring round Scotland over an 8-week period. The Bucket Trail was the largest mass public art project to have taken place in Scotland. The project ran from 27 June for two months, with the sculptures being auctioned in September for £883,000, for a new pediatric surgical suite at Tayside Children's Hospital. In 2019 Oor Wullie's BIG Bucket Trail 2019 was launched with 200 artistic interpretations of the figure at locations in cities across Scotland, raising money for Edinburgh Children's Hospital, Glasgow Children's Hospital and the Archie Foundation.

See also

 List of DC Thomson publications
 The Sunday Post
 The Broons
 Scots language

References

External links 
 Great Scots - Our loveable spiky-haired loon - The Scotsman newspaper (Archived version)
 Ron Low story
 Ron Low story follow up
 A lifesize model of Oor Wullie

1936 comics debuts
DC Thomson Comics strips
Scottish comics
Scots language
Scottish comics characters
Scottish comic strips
1936 establishments in Scotland
Comics characters introduced in 1936
Gag-a-day comics
Child characters in comics
Male characters in comics
Fictional Scottish people
Comics set in Scotland
DC Thomson Comics characters
Culture in Dundee